Gómez is a municipality of Isla Margarita in the state of Nueva Esparta, Venezuela.  The municipality is in the northeast of Margarita.
The capital is Santa Ana. 
The county is divided into five parishes: Bolivar Guevara, Matasiete, Santa Ana and Sucre.

Geography

The region in the east and south of the municipality is characterized by mountain ridges with forested valleys.
The northern half is lower, flatter, and much warmer than the mountains.
Annual precipitation averages .

History

The pueblo del Norte (now Santa Ana) village was founded around 1530 under the governorship of Aldonza Manrique.
Fortin España was built in the 17th century on the strategic hill of Santa Ana.
The municipality is named after General Francisco Esteban Gómez. He was born in Santa Ana on 26 December 1783. 
He defeated General Pablo Morillo in the Battle of Matasiete on 31 July 1817.
The capital, Santa Ana, is also known as Norte, Villa del Norte and Santa Ana del Norte. 
In the colonial period it was one of the most important towns on the island.
Simón Bolívar was recognized as Supreme Head of the Republic of Venezuela in the Assembly of Notables held on 6 May 1816 in the church of Santa Ana.

Economy

Tourism, handicrafts and fishing are the main economic activities of the municipality.
The products of the main towns and villages are:
Tacarigua: agriculture and handicraft production
Santa Ana: Municipal capital. Hammocks
La Vecindad: hammocks
El Cercado: ceramics
El Maco: typical shoes
Altagracia: traditional espadrilles are made with seashells and ornaments
Pedro González: mapires (hand baskets) made of palm
Guayacán: Fishing village

Gallery

References
Citations

Sources

Municipalities of Nueva Esparta
Margarita Island